The DB Cargo Company Train (formerly the DB Schenker Company Train and the EWS Company Train) is a special train operated in the United Kingdom by freight operator DB Cargo UK (formerly DB Schenker Rail (UK) formerly English Welsh & Scottish), a division of Deutsche Bahn. It was built as an inspection saloon replacement, and is also used to entertain corporate clients.  The train cost £3 million and took only nine months from concept to completion.

The design concept of using a Class 67 locomotive and Mk3 DVT in push pull mode was subsequently adopted by passenger operators such as Chiltern Railways, Wrexham & Shropshire and Arriva Trains Wales for commercial operations.

History and design
During the time that Keith Heller was CEO, Infleet Technology was commissioned to design the train.
The train was assembled as the replacement for the company's aging inspection saloon, and is used for entertaining corporate clients, for staff trips, managers, customers, functions, and as a "moving office".  In the first year of operation the Macmillan Cancer Support charity were allowed to use the train too for fund-raising.

The fixed configuration set consists of three British Rail Mark 3 coaches between a Mark 3 driving van trailer and Class 67 locomotive. The interior of the train was converted to a business/office/corporate entertainment environment, including a 'conference coach' room with 50-inch cinema screen, and seven-metre-long conference table, a dining coach, and a sleeper coach with bedrooms and en-suite washing facilities.

The trainset was fitted with a wiring system allowing the Class 67 to work in push–pull mode with the DVT and Mark 3 coaches.  In addition to normal inter-carriage connections this includes the addition of Multiple Working Jumper cable, and Cab to Train Data cable.  The DVT retains its Time Division Multiplexer (TDM) support but this is isolated and non-operational unless the company train is operating in push-pull mode with a Class 90 locomotive.  Locomotive 67029 was also modified to include a slight modification to the auto-couplers to enable connecting to the existing Mk3 buckeye couplers without touching the coach's rubbing plate—although it is normally attached using buffer-and-chain coupling. When not in use hauling the company train 67029 is used for normal railway working.

The train is explicitly exempted from regulations covering "Working of Passenger Trains Over Non-Passenger Lines", allowing the train to operate between freight depots without additional documentation requirements.  The train does not carry passengers per-se—all those on-board are regarded as either staff or invited guests.

In February 2012 the EWS 'Three Beasties' logo on the train's locomotive and driving van trailer was replaced with a Deutsche Bahn 'DB' logo.

Notes

References

External links 

 OO gauge model, Doncaster OO Gauge layout

 Hornby EWS Managers Train Pack (R2890) and Hornby EWS Managers Train Mk3 Buffet Car (R4434)

DB Cargo UK
Train-related introductions in 2004